The Issoire Silène was a sailplane produced in France in the 1970s and early 1980s, intended primarily as a trainer. It was a conventional design of fibreglass construction in versions with fixed or retractable monowheel undercarriage. The aircraft featured side-by-side seating for two, with the seats slightly staggered in order to minimise fuselage width. French certification was obtained on 3 February 1978, and production began shortly thereafter at the rate of two aircraft per month.

The original CE 75 design was refined as the E 78, which featured a redesigned and roomier cockpit, and was again available in fixed and retractable undercarriage versions. A further development, the I 79, was in development in 1979, and featured tanks for water ballast as well as hydraulically operated flaps, undercarriage, and airbrakes.

Specifications (CE 75 Silène)

References

Further reading
 
 
 
 

1970s French sailplanes
Glider aircraft
Aircraft first flown in 1974